Heptaloba tanglong is a moth of the family Pterophoridae described by Petr Ya. Ustjuzhanin and Vasily N. Kovtunovich in 2010. It is found in Vietnam. The habitat consists of long-boled forest with the predominance of Lagerstroemia species and various legumes, including Afzelia xylocarpa.

The wingspan is about 15 mm. The head, thorax and tegulae are brown and the antennae are pale brown. The forewings are reddish brown and are split in four lobes. Along the costal edge, in the distal part of the wing, there are four pale spots. The hindwings are pale brown.

Etymology
The species name is derived from two words in Vietnamese mythology, thăng (meaning "to fly") and long (meaning "dragon").

References

Moths described in 2010
Deuterocopinae